This article lists power stations in Malawi. All stations are owned by the Electricity Supply Commission of Malawi (ESCOM). The list is not exhaustive.

Hydroelectric

Thermal

Solar

See also 
 List of power stations in Africa
 List of largest power stations in the world

References

External links
Energy supply in Malawi: Options and issues As of May 2015.

Malawi
 
Power stations